Netball in Namibia is a popular sport, played at the national level.

International Competition
Namibia competed in the annual Confederation of Southern African Netball Associations (COSANA) tournament in 2008.

The 2010 Nations Cup, called NTUC FairPrice Foundation Nations Cup 2010, was held in December. Namibia beat India 72–32 to capture fifth.

As of January 2011, the women's national team was ranked number twenty-four in the world.

References

Bibliography

External links 
Netball South Africa